Géza Varga (born 15 November 1944) is a Hungarian former professional tennis player. He was the Hungarian national champion in 1982.

A right-handed player, Varga competed on the professional tour from the late 1960s through the 1970s.

Varga featured in the singles main draw of the French Open on three occasions, including in 1971 when he won a set against second seed Arthur Ashe. 

His best performance on the Grand Prix circuit was a semi-final appearance at the 1972 Dutch Open.

References

External links
 
 

1944 births
Living people
Hungarian male tennis players
20th-century Hungarian people
21st-century Hungarian people